Nectandra guadaripo is a species of plant in the family Lauraceae. It is found in Colombia and Ecuador.

References

guadaripo
Flora of Colombia
Flora of Ecuador
Vulnerable flora of South America
Taxonomy articles created by Polbot